"Brother" is a song by Dublin-based alternative rock quartet Kodaline. It was written by Jason Boland, Vincent May, Corey Sanders, Jon Maguire, Mark Prendergast, Alex Davies and Stephen Garrigan, with the song's production handled by Two Inch Punch and Stephen Harris. It was released to digital retailers on 23 June 2017, as the lead single from the band's third studio album Politics of Living.

Background
The band first teased the song's release through a tweet on 15 June 2017. A 15-second teaser was posted, along with the song's details, including its release date.

Music video
The music video was released alongside the single, and was directed by Stevie Russell, who also produced the music videos for the band's previous singles "Honest", "High Hopes" and "All I Want"."It was such a pleasure to work with Stevie again, every time we read one of his scripts they jump right off the page. We can't wait for everyone to see what he's done for 'Brother', he really captured the perfect vibe again," the band said in a statement.Robin Murray of Clash magazine described the video as "a highly moving, touching, directly emotional affair, one that taps into the core of the song." Rob Copsey of Official Charts Company described it as "emotional".

Critical reception
Robin Murray of Clash magazine wrote: "'Brother' has all those key Kodaline components - moving lyrics, and a soaring chorus." Rob Copsey of Official Charts Company called the production from Two Inch Punch and Stephen Harris a "nifty new production", and wrote that the song is "the rousing and emotional Kodaline you'll probably already be familiar with".

Track listing

Credits and personnel
Credits adapted from Tidal.

 Jason Boland – composer, lyricist, bass guitarist, background vocalist
 Vincent May – composer, lyricist, background vocalist, drummer, percussionist
 Corey Sanders – composer, lyricist
 Jon Maguire – composer, lyricist, programmer
 Mark Prendergast – composer, lyricist, background vocalist, guitarist, pianist, strings player
 Alex Davies – composer, lyricist, strings player
 Stephen Garrigan – composer, lyricist, vocalist, background vocalist
 Two Inch Punch – producer
 Stephen Harris – producer, strings player
 Mark Stent – mixing engineer
 Stuart Hawkes – mastering engineer
 Ben Ash – keyboard engineer, programmer

Charts

Certifications

References

2017 singles
2017 songs
Kodaline songs
B-Unique Records singles
Songs written by Two Inch Punch
Songs written by Jon Maguire